is a Japanese former cyclist. He competed in the sprint event at the 1984 Summer Olympics. He is also a professional keirin cyclist with more than 300 wins.

References

External links
 

1964 births
Living people
Japanese male cyclists
Olympic cyclists of Japan
Cyclists at the 1984 Summer Olympics
Sportspeople from Osaka
Keirin cyclists
Asian Games medalists in cycling
Cyclists at the 1982 Asian Games
Asian Games silver medalists for Japan
Medalists at the 1982 Asian Games